is a railway station on the Chikuhi Line in Itoshima, Fukuoka Prefecture, Japan, operated by JR Kyushu.

Lines
Local and weekday rapid services on the Chikuhi Line stop at this station.

Station layout 
The station consists of an island platform two tracks. The station building is a modern hashigami structure where the station facilities are located on a bridge spanning the platform and which has entrances on both sides of the tracks. The bridge houses a waiting area, a staffed ticket window and ticket gates. From there, steps and an elevator give access to the island platform.

Management of the station has been outsourced to the JR Kyushu Tetsudou Eigyou Co., a wholly owned subsidiary of JR Kyushu specialising in station services. It staffs the ticket counter which is equipped with a Midori no Madoguchi facility.

Platforms

Adjacent stations

History
Hatae Station was opened on 1 July 1928 as an additional station on the track. When the Kitakyushu Railway was nationalized on 1 October 1937, Japanese Government Railways (JGR) took over control of the station and designated the line which served it as the Chikuhi Line. With the privatization of Japanese National Railways (JNR), the successor of JGR, on 1 April 1987, control of the station passed to JR Kyushu.

Passenger statistics
In fiscal 2016, the station was used by an average of 2,927 passengers daily (boarding passengers only), and it ranked 63rd among the busiest stations of JR Kyushu.

Surrounding area
JA Itoshima Hatae Branch
Hatae Post Office
Sannomiya Shrine

See also
 List of railway stations in Japan

References

External links
Hatae Station (JR Kyushu)

Railway stations in Japan opened in 1928
Chikuhi Line
Railway stations in Fukuoka Prefecture
Stations of Kyushu Railway Company